The 1981–82 Detroit Red Wings season was the with name Red Wings 50th season, 56th overall for the franchise.

Offseason
The National Hockey League realigned their divisions into geographically closer groupings. The Red Wings were the only team to remain in the Norris Division from the previous season, while the division itself was moved from the Prince of Wales Conference to the Campbell Conference, trading places with the Patrick Division. The Red Wings were joined in the Norris by the Chicago Black Hawks, Toronto Maple Leafs, St. Louis Blues, Minnesota North Stars, and Winnipeg Jets.

Regular season

Final standings

Schedule and results

Playoffs
This was the fourth straight season the Red Wings failed to make the Stanley Cup Playoffs, having last qualified in 1978.

Player statistics

Regular season
Scoring

Goaltending

Note: GP = Games played; G = Goals; A = Assists; Pts = Points; +/- = Plus-minus PIM = Penalty minutes; PPG = Power-play goals; SHG = Short-handed goals; GWG = Game-winning goals;
      MIN = Minutes played; W = Wins; L = Losses; T = Ties; GA = Goals against; GAA = Goals-against average;  SO = Shutouts;

Awards and records

Transactions

Draft picks
Detroit's draft picks at the 1981 NHL Entry Draft held at the Montreal Forum in Montreal, Quebec.

Farm teams

See also
1981–82 NHL season

References

External links

Detroit Red Wings seasons
Detroit
Detroit
Detroit Red
Detroit Red